Virgil Baer (December 5, 1912 – July 14, 1993) was an American football and basketball coach.  He was the 11th head football coach at Kansas Wesleyan University in Salina, Kansas, serving for three seasons, from 1946 to 1948, and compiling a record of 12–12–3.

Head coaching record

Football

References

External links
 Virgil Baer's obituary
 

1912 births
1993 deaths
Basketball coaches from Kansas
Kansas Wesleyan Coyotes football coaches
Kansas Wesleyan Coyotes men's basketball coaches
People from Dickinson County, Kansas